Donald Joseph Lawler (1922 – 20 March 1988) was an Irish footballer. He competed in the men's tournament at the 1948 Summer Olympics.

References

External links
 

1922 births
1988 deaths
Republic of Ireland association footballers
Olympic footballers of Ireland
Footballers at the 1948 Summer Olympics
Association football goalkeepers